Isaac is one of the three patriarchs of the Israelites and an important figure in the Abrahamic religions, including Judaism, Christianity, and Islam. He was the son of Abraham and Sarah, the father of Jacob and Esau, and the grandfather of the twelve tribes of Israel.

Isaac's name means "he will laugh", reflecting the laughter, in disbelief, of Abraham and Sarah, when told by God that they would have a child. He is the only patriarch whose name was not changed, and the only one who did not move out of Canaan. According to the narrative, he died aged 180, the longest-lived of the three patriarchs.

Etymology
The anglicized name "Isaac" is a transliteration of the Hebrew name  which literally means "He laughs/will laugh." Ugaritic texts dating from the 13th century BCE refer to the benevolent smile of the Canaanite deity El. Genesis, however, ascribes the laughter to Isaac's parents, Abraham and Sarah, rather than El. According to the biblical narrative, Abraham fell on his face and laughed when God (Hebrew) imparted the news of their son's eventual birth. He laughed because Sarah was past the age of childbearing; both she and Abraham were advanced in age. Later, when Sarah overheard three messengers of the Lord renew the promise, she laughed inwardly for the same reason. Sarah denied laughing when God questioned Abraham about it.

Genesis narrative

Birth
After God changes Abram and Sarai's names to Abraham and Sarah, he tells Abraham that he will bear a second son by Sarah named Isaac, with whom a new covenant would be established. In response, Abraham began to laugh, as both he and Sarah were well beyond natural child-bearing age. Some time later, three men who Abraham identifies as messengers of God visit him and Sarah, and Abraham treats them to food and niceties. They repeat the prophecy that Sarah would bear a child, promising Isaac's birth within a year's time, at which point Sarah laughs in disbelief. God questions why the pair laughed in disbelief at his words, and if it is because they believe such things were not within his power. Now afraid, they futilely deny ever having laughed at God's words.

Time passes as Isaac is born. Although this was Abraham's second son (Abraham's first son was Ishmael, with Hagar) it was Sarah's first and only child.

On the eighth day from his birth, Isaac was circumcised, as was necessary for all males of Abraham's household, in order to be in compliance with Yahweh's covenant.

After Isaac had been weaned, Sarah saw Ishmael playing with him, and urged her husband to cast out Hagar the bondservant and her son, so that Isaac would be Abraham's sole heir. Abraham was hesitant, but at God's order he listened to his wife's request.

Binding

At some point in Isaac's youth, his father Abraham took him to Mount Moriah. At God's command, Abraham was to build a sacrificial altar and sacrifice his son Isaac upon it. After he had bound his son to the altar and drawn his knife to kill him, at the last moment an angel of God prevented Abraham from proceeding. Instead, he was directed to sacrifice a nearby ram that was stuck in thickets.

Family life

Before Isaac was 40 (Genesis 25:20), Abraham sent Eliezer, his steward, into Mesopotamia to find a wife for Isaac, from his nephew Bethuel's family. Eliezer chose the Aramean Rebekah for Isaac. After many years of marriage to Isaac, Rebekah had still not given birth to a child and was believed to be barren. Isaac prayed for her and she conceived. Rebekah gave birth to twin boys, Esau and Jacob. Isaac was 60 years old when his two sons were born. Isaac favored Esau, and Rebekah favored Jacob.

The narratives about Isaac do not mention his having concubines.

Migration
Isaac moved to Beer-lahai-roi after his father died. When the land experienced famine, he moved to the Philistine land of Gerar where his father once lived. This land was still under the control of King Abimelech as it was in the days of Abraham. Like his father, Isaac also deceived Abimelech about his wife and also got into the well business. He had gone back to all of the wells that his father dug and saw that they were all stopped up with earth. The Philistines did this after Abraham died. So, Isaac unearthed them and began to dig for more wells all the way to Beersheba, where he made a pact with Abimelech, just like in the day of his father.

Birthright
Isaac grew old and became blind. He called his son Esau and directed him to procure some venison for him, in order to receive Isaac's blessing. While Esau was hunting, Jacob, after listening to his mother's advice, deceived his blind father by misrepresenting himself as Esau and thereby obtained his father's blessing, such that Jacob became Isaac's primary heir and Esau was left in an inferior position. According to Genesis 25:29–34, Esau had previously sold his birthright to Jacob for "bread and stew of lentils". Thereafter, Isaac sent Jacob into Mesopotamia to take a wife of his mother's brother's house. After 20 years working for his uncle Laban, Jacob returned home. He reconciled with his twin brother Esau, then he and Esau buried their father, Isaac, in Hebron after he died at the age of 180.

Burial site

According to local tradition, the graves of Isaac and Rebekah, along with the graves of Abraham and Sarah and Jacob and Leah, are in the Cave of the Patriarchs.

Jewish views
In rabbinical tradition, the age of Isaac at the time of binding is taken to be 37, which contrasts with common portrayals of Isaac as a child. The rabbis also thought that the reason for the death of Sarah was the news of the intended sacrifice of Isaac. The sacrifice of Isaac is cited in appeals for the mercy of God in later Jewish traditions. According to a version of these interpretations, Isaac died in the sacrifice and was revived. According to many accounts of Aggadah, unlike the Bible, it is Satan who is testing Isaac as an agent of God. Isaac's willingness to follow God's command at the cost of his death has been a model for many Jews who preferred martyrdom to violation of the Jewish law.

According to the Jewish tradition, Isaac instituted the afternoon prayer. This tradition is based on Genesis chapter 24, verse 63 ("Isaac went out to meditate in the field at the eventide").

Isaac was the only patriarch who stayed in Canaan during his whole life and though once he tried to leave, God told him not to do so. Rabbinic tradition gave the explanation that Isaac was almost sacrificed and anything dedicated as a sacrifice may not leave the Land of Israel. Isaac was the oldest of the biblical patriarchs at the time of his death, and the only patriarch whose name was not changed.

Rabbinic literature also linked Isaac's blindness in old age, as stated in the Bible, to the sacrificial binding: Isaac's eyes went blind because the tears of angels present at the time of his sacrifice fell on Isaac's eyes.

Christian views

The early Christian church continued and developed the New Testament theme of Isaac as a type of Christ and the Church being both "the son of the promise" and the "father of the faithful". Tertullian draws a parallel between Isaac's bearing the wood for the sacrificial fire with Christ's carrying his cross. and there was a general agreement that, while all the sacrifices of the Old Law were anticipations of that on Calvary, the sacrifice of Isaac was so "in a pre-eminent way".

The Eastern Orthodox Church and the Roman Catholic Church consider Isaac as a saint along with other biblical patriarchs. Along with those of other patriarchs and the Old Testament Righteous, his feast day is celebrated in the Eastern Orthodox Church and the Byzantine rite of the Catholic Church on the Second Sunday before Christmas (December 11–17), under the title the Sunday of the Forefathers.

Isaac is commemorated in the Catholic Church on 25 March or on 17 December.

New Testament
The New Testament states Isaac was "offered up" by his father Abraham, and that Isaac blessed his sons. Paul contrasted Isaac, symbolizing Christian liberty, with the rejected older son Ishmael, symbolizing slavery; Hagar is associated with the Sinai covenant, while Sarah is associated with the covenant of grace, into which her son Isaac enters. The Epistle of James chapter 2, verses 21–24, states that the sacrifice of Isaac shows that justification (in the Johannine sense) requires both faith and works.

In the Epistle to the Hebrews, Abraham's willingness to follow God's command to sacrifice Isaac is used as an example of faith as is Isaac's action in blessing Jacob and Esau with reference to the future promised by God to Abraham. In verse 19, the author views the release of Isaac from sacrifice as analogous to the resurrection of Jesus, the idea of the sacrifice of Isaac being a prefigurement of the sacrifice of Jesus on the cross.

Islamic views

Islam considers Isaac a prophet, and describes him as the father of the Israelites and a righteous servant of God.

Isaac, along with Ishmael, is highly important for Muslims for continuing to preach the message of monotheism after his father Abraham. Among Isaac's children was the follow-up Israelite patriarch Jacob, who is also venerated as an Islamic prophet.

Isaac is mentioned seventeen times by name in the Quran, often with his father and his son, Jacob. The Quran states that Abraham received "good tidings of Isaac, a prophet, of the righteous", and that God blessed them both. In a fuller description, when angels came to Abraham to tell him of the future punishment to be imposed on Sodom and Gomorrah, his wife, Sarah, "laughed, and We gave her good tidings of Isaac, and after Isaac of (a grandson) Jacob"; and it is further explained that this event will take place despite Abraham and Sarah's old age. Several verses speak of Isaac as a "gift" to Abraham (6:84; 14:49–50), and 24:26–27 adds that God made "prophethood and the Book to be among his offspring", which has been interpreted to refer to Abraham's two prophetic sons, his prophetic grandson Jacob, and his prophetic great-grandson Joseph. In the Quran, it later narrates that Abraham also praised God for giving him Ishmael and Isaac in his old age.

Elsewhere in the Quran, Isaac is mentioned in lists: Joseph follows the religion of his forefathers Abraham, Isaac and Jacob and speaks of God's favor to them; Jacob's sons all testify their faith and promise to worship the God that their forefathers, "Abraham, Ishmael and Isaac", worshiped; and the Quran commands Muslims to believe in the revelations that were given to "Abraham, Ishmael, Isaac, Jacob and the Patriarchs". In the Quran's narrative of Abraham's near-sacrifice of his son, the name of the son is not mentioned and debate has continued over the son's identity, though many feel that the identity is the least important element in a story which is given to show the courage that one develops through faith.

Quran
The Quran mentions Isaac as a prophet and a righteous man of God. Isaac and Jacob are mentioned as being bestowed upon Abraham as gifts of God, who then worshipped God only and were righteous leaders in the way of God:

Academic
Some scholars have described Isaac as "a legendary figure" or "as a figure representing tribal history, or "as a seminomadic leader." The stories of Isaac, like other patriarchal stories of Genesis, are generally believed to have "their origin in folk memories and oral traditions of the early Hebrew pastoralist experience." The Cambridge Companion to the Bible makes the following comment on the biblical stories of the patriarchs:

According to Martin Noth, a scholar of the Hebrew Bible, the narratives of Isaac date back to an older cultural stage than that of the West-Jordanian Jacob. At that era, the Israelite tribes were not yet sedentary. In the course of looking for grazing areas, they had come in contact in southern Philistia with the inhabitants of the settled countryside. The biblical historian A. Jopsen believes in the connection between the Isaac traditions and the north, and in support of this theory adduces Amos 7:9 ("the high places of Isaac").

Albrecht Alt and Martin Noth hold that, "The figure of Isaac was enhanced when the theme of promise, previously bound to the cults of the 'God the Fathers' was incorporated into the Israelite creed during the southern-Palestinian stage of the growth of the Pentateuch tradition." According to Martin Noth, at the Southern Palestinian stage of the growth of the Pentateuch tradition, Isaac became established as one of the biblical patriarchs, but his traditions were receded in the favor of Abraham.

In art

The earliest Christian portrayal of Isaac is found in the Roman catacomb frescoes. Excluding the fragments, Alison Moore Smith classifies these artistic works in three categories:

See also

 Biblical and Quranic narratives
 Testament of Isaac
 Wife–sister narratives in the Book of Genesis – three such narratives, involving Abraham (two) and Isaac (one)

Notes

Citations

References

External links

 Isaac in Jewish Encyclopedia
 
 Abraham's son as the intended sacrifice (Al-Dhabih, Qur'an 37:99, Qur'an 37:99–113): Issues in qur'anic exegesis, journal of Semitic Studies XXX1V/ Spring 1989
 
 

 
Biblical patriarchs
Children of Abraham
Christian saints from the Old Testament
Esau
People whose existence is disputed
Vayeira
Catholic saints
Eastern Orthodox saints
Mythological blind people